Doug Phillips (born February 29, 1968) is an American football coach, He is the head football coach of the Youngstown State University, a position he had held since 2020. A native of New Middletown, Ohio, Phillips attended the University of Toledo from 1987 to 1991.

Head coaching record

College

References

External links
 Youngstown State profile

1968 births
Living people
Bowling Green Falcons football coaches
Cincinnati Bearcats football coaches
Ohio State Buckeyes football coaches
Youngstown State Penguins football coaches
High school football coaches in Ohio
University of Toledo alumni
People from Mahoning County, Ohio
Coaches of American football from Ohio